A split season is a schedule format implemented in a variety of sports leagues. The season is divided into two parts, with the winners of both halves playing each other at the end for the overall championship.

Split seasons are usually found in sports with longer seasons, such as baseball, basketball, and association football. They are common in scholastic sports, specifically basketball, in the United States. A number of Minor League Baseball leagues also use split seasons. In Latin America, some association football leagues use a similar format known as Apertura and Clausura.

Baseball

Major League Baseball
Major League Baseball has used split seasons twice in its history.

1892
In 1892, the National League decided to split its season in an attempt to increase interest, following the collapse of the rival American Association.

The Boston Beaneaters won the first half of the season, while the Cleveland Spiders took the second half. Boston defeated Cleveland 5 games to 0, with one tie, in the championship series.

1981
In 1981, the Major League season was interrupted by a players' strike. Due to the two-month strike, the owners tried to create an equitable solution. So on August 6, the owners decided to split the 1981 season into two halves, with the first-place teams from each half in each division (or a wild card team if the same club won both halves) meeting in a best-of-five divisional playoff series. The four survivors would then move on to the two best-of-five League Championship Series. The extra round of postseason playoffs were won by the Yankees, Athletics, Expos, and Dodgers.

Minor leagues

In Minor League Baseball, split seasons have been used at several levels. Prior to the reorganization of 2021, the minor leagues using split seasons were:
 Double-A: Southern League, Texas League
 Class A-Advanced: California League, Carolina League, Florida State League
 Class A: Midwest League, South Atlantic League

Among independent minor leagues, the Atlantic League and Pacific Association used a split schedule.

If a team should win both halves of a season, most leagues still have a postseason championship series, with that team facing the team with the second-best overall record. Alternately, a team winning both halves can be immediately declared league champion; while historically this was the practice in some leagues, foregoing postseason series is uncommon in contemporary professional baseball.

One reason given for the use of split seasons in the minors is that the purpose of these leagues is different than that of Major League Baseball. These leagues are primarily for the development of players. As such, players may move from level to level at any time during the season. A team with many very good players in the early part of the season may see them promoted, leaving lesser players remaining for the latter part of the season. It also allows teams that played poorly in the first half to continue to play meaningful games later in the season.

Nippon Professional Baseball
Nippon Professional Baseball's (NPB) Pacific League (PL) employed a split season format once from 1973 to 1982. The PL hoped that the new format would significantly increase fan interest. The season was divided into two, 65-game halves. The two teams that won each half went on to play each other in a five-game playoff series. The winner of the series was named the PL champion and went on to play the Central League (CL) champion in the Japan Series.

Playoff games under the split-season format were commercially successful and often played to sold out crowds, a rare occurrence during the Pacific League's regular season. The format, however, had several problems and criticisms. It allowed a team with only the third-best winning percentage for the full season to reach the playoffs and the Japan Series. The Seibu Lions' manager during the split-season format's final season, Tatsuro Hirooka, heavily criticized the playoff system for this reason. He believed teams could potentially abuse the format by focusing on the first half alone instead of the full season. Then, once a team became the first-half champion, it could rest players during the second half as their playoff berth had already been guaranteed. Another problem specific to the split-season format is that the playoff series was cancelled if one team won both half seasons. This occurred twice, in the 1976 and 1978 seasons. These issues led to the format being scrapped after ten years.

Association football

The Apertura and Clausura tournaments are a relatively recent innovation for many Latin American football leagues in which the traditional season from August to May is divided in two sections per season, each with its own champion. Apertura and Clausura are the Spanish words for "opening" and "closing".  In French-speaking Haiti, these are known as the Ouverture and the Fermeture, while in English-speaking Belize, they are respectively the "Opening" and "Closing" seasons. The North American Soccer League (NASL), a second-level league in the United States and Canada, adopted a split season in 2013; the season was divided into a "Spring Championship" and "Fall Championship".

Basketball
In its only complete season, the American Basketball League conducted a split season. The champions of East and West divisions in the first half met for a three-game playoff series in January 1962, won by the Kansas City Steers. After that series, the second half of the season began. The second half playoffs were more complicated, featuring a six-team tournament, won by the Cleveland Pipers. Once that was concluded, Cleveland defeated Kansas City for the overall championship.

American football
The World Football League, for its 1975 season, planned on using the split season to determine the two teams that would play in World Bowl 2 that year, with the 18-game regular season divided into two nine-game segments. The Memphis Southmen won the first half of the regular season; the second half was never completed, and the league would fold two weeks after the 1975 season midpoint.

References

Sports terminology